Brachyscome chrysoglossa, the yellow-tongue daisy, is a perennial herb from Australia in the family Asteraceae. The species is endemic to Australia.

Description
This species has an erect growth habit, ranging between 15 and 40 cm in height, with yellow inflorescences. The main flowering period is between September and January in its native range.

Taxonomy
The species was first formally described by botanist Ferdinand von Mueller, his description published in Transactions of the Philosophical Society of Victoria in 1855. The type was described as growing "in the Mallee scrub towards the north-western boundaries of the colony [Victoria]". The name has sometimes been misapplied to Brachyscome heterodonta.

Distribution
Brachyscome chrysoglossa  is locally common in  New South Wales and Victoria where it occurs on clay soils which are subject to inundation.

References

chrysoglossa
Flora of New South Wales
Flora of Victoria (Australia)
Plants described in 1855
Taxa named by Ferdinand von Mueller